Calceta is a town in the Manabí province of Ecuador.
Situated on the banks of the Carrizal river, and surrounded a valley of the same name, Calceta is a center of trade and services for the north-central zone of Manabí. It has a dozen high schools and more than twenty schools. 3 kilometres away is the Escuela Superior Politécnica de Manabí (ESPAM), a modern agricultural and environmental university.

Attractions
The tower of the Juan Manuel Alava public clock, The Saint Agustín Church, the Civic Square, and the San Bartolo old red bridge, assembled in 1910.
 yun lugar muy atractivo

Sources 
World-Gazetteer.com

Populated places in Manabí Province